Robert Reed Ingram (born 1962) is an American politician. He serves as a Republican member of the Alabama House of Representatives for District 75, encompassing parts of Elmore County and Montgomery County.

References

Living people
Republican Party members of the Alabama House of Representatives
1962 births
21st-century American politicians